Martin Short is a Canadian actor and comedian known for his performances in film, television, and theatre.
 
He is known for his performances on SCTV, Saturday Night Live, and Only Murders in the Building. He has received a Golden Globe Award nomination, two Screen Actors Guild Award nominations, and fifteen Emmy Award nominations winning two Primetime Emmy Awards. He has also received two Tony Award nominations winning in 1999 for Best Actor in a Musical in Little Me.

Major associations

Emmy Awards

Golden Globe Awards

Screen Actors Guild Awards

Tony Awards

Industry awards

Critics' Choice Television Awards

Canadian Screen Awards

Hollywood Critics Association TV Awards

MTV Movie & TV Awards

Satellite Award

Writers Guild of America Awards

Theatre awards

Drama Desk Awards

Outer Critics Circle

Theatre World Award

Honours 

 1982: Nelly Award: Outstanding Writing, SCTV Comedy Network
 1994: Member of the Order of Canada
 1995: Earl Grey Lifetime Achievement Award
 1999: Sir Peter Ustinov Award awarded at the Banff Television Festival  
 2000: Canada's Walk of Fame
 2001: Awarded honorary Doctor of Literature from McMaster University
 2002: Queen Elizabeth II Golden Jubilee Medal
 2012: Queen Elizabeth II Diamond Jubilee Medal
 2014: Robert Altman Award from Independent Spirit Awards for Inherent Vice 
 2015: A stamp issued by Canada Post
 2016: Canadian Screen Awards Lifetime Achievement Award
 2019: Officer of the Order of Canada.

References 

Short, Martin